YM Uranus is a tanker registered under the Maltese flag. It was involved in a collision on 8 October 2010 off the coast of Brittany, France.

Description
She is assessed as 4,829 GT, 2,297 NT and 7,000 DWT.

The ship is propelled by a  MAN diesel engine which was built by STX Corporation of Korea. The engine has six cylinders of  diameter by  stroke.

History
YM Uranus was built by Marmara Shipyards, Istanbul, Turkey. She was launched on 5 November 2008. Her port of registry is Valletta, Malta. YM Uranus is operated under the management of V Ships UK Ltd, Glasgow. All 13 crew took to the lifeboats at around 03:30 UTC, from where they were rescued by a French helicopter and taken to Brest. The ship was taken under tow by French tug Abeille Bourbon. Making , it took about 13 hours to reach Brest. YM Uranus was on a voyage from Porto Marghera, Italy to Amsterdam, Netherlands. Hanjin Rizhao was on a voyage from Las Palmas, Spain to Rotterdam, Netherlands.

References

2008 ships
Ships built in Istanbul
Merchant ships of Malta
Maritime incidents in 2010